Weeping Angel may refer to:

 Weeping Angel, an alternate title for the 1894  William Wetmore Story sculpture Angel of Grief
 Weeping Angel, a hacking tool co-developed by the CIA and MI5 and documented in the Wikileaks Vault 7 series of documents
 The Weeping Angels, a race of predatory creatures in the Doctor Who television series